Diffusion chronometry is a geological technique that examines the chemical zoning within phenocrysts to estimate the duration between the events that occur in magmatic system and their associated eruptions. Diffusion chronometry should not be confused with geospeedometry. Both utilize the theory of chemical diffusion but the latter is more commonly used for analyzing rates of metamorphic events whereas the former is used to analyze features of eruptive events. 

Eruptive events can occur on a time scale of days or months which, geologically speaking, is very hard to analyze using traditional radiometric dating techniques. The benefit with diffusion chronometry is the ability to analyze chemical zoning changes and is only limited by the resolution of the scanning electron microscope used. From a geological hazard standpoint the use of diffusion chronometry could help in predicting eruptions by gaining a better understanding of the timescales between magma and crystal interaction.

The diffusion profiles of crystals within a single eruption have been used to constrain the time taken to assemble and erupt a magma reservoir and to track the dynamic events within a magma region over a period of months.

References

Geological techniques